Wimble Toot is a burial mound or, possibly, a motte built near the village of Babcary, Somerset, England. It is a scheduled ancient monument with a list entry number of 1015279.

Etymology
Toot is derived from Old English tōt, meaning a lookout point.

Details
Wimble Toot is generally interpreted as a typical bowl barrow dating to the Bronze Age, between 2600 and 700 BC. The site is of an undetermined age, and appears to have been a part of the Romano-British landscape. In Roman times, Wimble Toot was situated at a crossroads.

An alternative interpretation is that the monument is a possible motte built between 1067 and 1069. According to this view, Wimble Toot was probably built by the Norman lord Robert of Mortain to protect the River Cary and the nearby settlement of Ilchester.

Today the site is a scheduled monument.

References

References

Barker, Katherine (1986) "Pen, Ilchester and Yeovil: A Study in the Landscape History and Archaeology of South-East Somerset". Proceedings of the Somerset Archaeology and Natural History Society. Volume 130, pp. 11-45. Taunton, Somerset: Somerset Archaeology and Natural History Society.
Historic England (2015) Pastscape: Wimble Toot. Swindon, Wiltshire, UK: Historic England. Accessed 2017-11-15.
Historic England (2017) Bowl barrow known as 'Wimble Toot'. Swindon, Wiltshire, UK: Historic England. Accessed 2017-11-15.
Prior, Stuart. (2006) The Norman Art of War: a Few Well-Positioned Castles. Stroud, UK: Tempus. .

Further reading
Grinsell, L. V. (1971) "Somerset barrows, part 2: North and East." Somerset Archaeology and Natural History (115), Supplement (88).

Scheduled monuments in South Somerset
Barrows in England